Barkagaon  Assembly constituency is an assembly constituency in the Indian state of Jharkhand under Hazaribagh district. It consists of three blocks namely Barkagaon, Keredari and Patratu.

Indian National Congress MLAs in Jharkhand claimed that their colleague, Barkagaon's current MLA Nirmala Devi, was arrested on 25 August 2015 for a murder in the Hazaribagh district 9 days before. Fellow MLA, Irfan Ansari of Jamtara constituency, condemned the arrest, alleging that the government is trying to attack INC legislators by falsely accusing them of crimes they never committed. Its come under Hazaribagh district.

Members of Assembly 
1980: Ramendra Kumar, Communist Party of India
1985: Ramendra Kumar, Communist Party of India
1990: Ramendra Kumar, Communist Party of India
1995: Loknath Mahto, Bharatiya Janata Party
2000: Loknath Mahto, Bharatiya Janata Party
2005: Loknath Mahto, Bharatiya Janata Party
2009: Yogendra Sao, Indian National Congress
2014: Nirmala Devi, Indian National Congress
2019 :Amba Prasad, Indian National Congress

Election Results

2019

See also
Vidhan Sabha
List of states of India by type of legislature

References

Schedule – XIII of Constituencies Order, 2008 of Delimitation of Parliamentary and Assembly constituencies Order, 2008 of the Election Commission of India 

Assembly constituencies of Jharkhand